Darley Stud is located at Dalham Hall, the global breeding operation owned by Sheikh Mohammed bin Rashid al-Maktoum, the Ruler of Dubai and vice-president of the United Arab Emirates. It is on the outskirts of Newmarket, Suffolk, the international headquarters and historic home of thoroughbred horse racing.

Darley currently stands more than 50 stallions around the world: in England at Dalham Hall Stud, in Ireland at Kildangan Stud, in the United States at Jonabell Farm, in Lexington, Kentucky, and on two stud farms in Australia: at Northwood Park, Victoria, and at Kelvinside in the Hunter Valley in New South Wales. Darley stallions also stand in France and Japan.

Darley was founded in 1981 when Sheikh Mohammed purchased Dalham Hall Stud. Today, Darley studs are home to many of Europe's leading stallions. These include father and son super sires Dawn Approach and New Approach, and Dubawi, already sire of a number of G1 winners.

Other famous stallions who have stood at Dalham Hall include Dubai Millennium, Sheikh Mohammed's favourite horse. Born on the stud and trained in Newmarket, he won the Dubai World Cup in 2000 and was the eight-length winner of the Prince of Wales's Stakes at Royal Ascot in the same year. When he retired from horse racing, Dubai Millennium returned to the stud but sired just one crop of foals before dying of grass sickness.

In addition to standing stallions, Darley manages the racing interests of Sheikh Mohammed and various members of the Maktoum family, and has racehorses with a number of trainers in the UK, Ireland, France, the United States, Australia, and Japan. The best of these horses transfer to Godolphin, Sheikh Mohammed's racing stable.

In 2014, Darley Australia, together with rival Coolmore and a number of local viticulturists, won a battle against Anglo American Coal to stop the expansion of the company's Drayton South open cast mining operation in the Hunter Valley.

Stallions standing at Darley (2022)

Dalham Hall Stud, Newmarket, UK
 Cracksman
 Dubawi
 Farhh
 Iffraaj
 Harry Angel (Shuttles to Kelvinside)
 Masar
 New Approach
 Palace Pier (Shuttles to Kelvinside)
 Perfect Power
 Pinatubo (Shuttles to Kelvinside)
 Postponed
 Territories
 Too Darn Hot (Shuttles to Kelvinside)

Haras du Logis, Normandy, France
 Cloth of Stars
 Ribchester
 Victor Ludorum (Shuttles to Kelvinside)

Kildangan Stud, County Kildare, Ireland
 Blue Point (Shuttles to Northwood Park)
 Earthlight (Shuttles to Northwood Park)
 Ghaiyyath (Shuttles to Northwood Park)
 Naval Crown
 Night of Thunder
 Profitable
 Raven's Pass
 Ribchester
 Space Blues
 Teofilo

Jonabell Farm, Kentucky, United States
 Enticed
 Essential Quality
 Frosted (Shuttles to Northwood Park)
 Hard Spun
 Maxfield
 Medaglia d'Oro
 Midshipman
 Mystic Guide
 Nyquist
 Street Boss (Shuttles to Kelvinside)
 Speaker's Corner
 Street Sense

Kelvinside, New South Wales, Australia
 Astern
 Bivouac
 Exceed and Excel
 Lonhro
 Microphone

Northwood Park, Victoria, Australia
 Brazen Beau
 Impending
 Kermadec

Darley Japan
 Admire Moon
 American Patriot
 Discreet Cat
 Fine Needle
 Furioso
 Hawkbill
 Pyro
 Talismanic
 Thunder Snow
 Tower of London
 Will Take Charge

References

External links
 

Horse farms in the United Kingdom
Newmarket, Suffolk